Vincent M. Holt was the author of an 1885 manifesto, titled Why Not Eat Insects? that laid out the arguments in favor of eating insects.

He argued against eating lobsters.  "The lobster, a creature consumed in incredible quantities at all the highest tables in the land, such a foul feeder that, for its sure capture, the experienced fisherman will bait his lobster-pot with putrid flesh or fish which is too far gone even to attract a crab."

References

External links
Why Not Eat Insects?   (Field & Tuer, Leadenhall Press, 1885) (Scan of 1885 book)
Why Not Eat Insects?

Insects as food